In algebra, a polynomial functor is an endofunctor on the category  of finite-dimensional vector spaces that depends polynomially on vector spaces.

The notion appears in representation theory as well as category theory (the calculus of functors). In particular, the category of homogeneous polynomial functors of degree n is equivalent to the category of finite-dimensional representations of the symmetric group  over a field of characteristic zero.

Definition 
Let k be a field of characteristic zero and  the category of finite-dimensional k-vector spaces and k-linear maps. Then an endofunctor  is a polynomial functor if the following equivalent conditions hold:

Variants 
If “finite vector spaces” is replaced by “finite sets”, one gets the notion of combinatorial species (to be precise, those of polynomial nature).

References 

 

Functors